Kashkaval is a type of cheese made from cow's milk, sheep's milk or both. In Albania, Bulgaria, Kosovo, North Macedonia, Romania and Serbia, the term is often used to refer to all yellow cheeses (or even any cheese other than sirene). In English-language menus in Bulgaria, kashkaval is translated as "yellow cheese" (whereas sirene is usually translated as "white cheese" or simply "cheese").

Etymology 

Another theory exists. Some researchers from the Faculty of Veterinary Medicine of the University of Belgrade claim the Aromanian population, a native Balkan people, created cașcaval. As in Romanian, the word caș means 'cheese' in Aromanian. Balkan etymology is given for the suffix -kaval in the word kachkaval in the study, nor do the researchers mention the horse, the Latin term  or even the Italian term  and instead refer to the seasonal movement of the semi nomadic Vlachs and their livestock between fixed summer and winter pastures (transhumance).

Locality

Albania 
In Albania, kaçkavall is the most popular type of cheese after djathë i bardhë (white cheese). It is considered a traditional Albanian cheese, and is widely used as a side dish. A great majority of traditional restaurants will bring plates of raw or fried kaçkavall for no additional cost before the main dishes finish cooking. All dairy companies in Albania produce kaçkavall and mainly use cow's or sheep's milk.

Bulgaria 

In Bulgaria, kashkaval is made from cow's milk and is known as kashkaval vitosha, while a variation made from ewe's milk is called kashkaval balkan. Kashkaval preslav is the name given to the cheese made from a mixture of both milks.

Kashkaval is a traditional food used in most of the breakfast pastry. One of the most common dishes with kashkaval is kashkavalka which is a little pastry containing kashkaval inside and on top. Like in the other Balkan countries, it is a major substitute for all other kinds of cheese, especially in pizzas. Another popular Bulgarian snack is princesa ("princess"), which is a grilled slice of bread topped with kashkaval or topped with ground pork meat and kashkaval.

Regional varieties have their distinct properties. For example, kashkaval vitosha is made of cow's cheese, kashkaval balkan is made of sheep's cheese, while kashkaval preslav is made of both.

Israel
Kashkaval is one of the most popular types of cheese in Israel, due to the large Jewish population of eastern and southeastern European origins.

Romania and Moldova 
In Romania and Moldova, cașcaval is used to refer to a number of types of yellow medium and semi hard cheeses made of sheep's or cow's-milk. The best known varieties of cașcaval in Romania are dobrogea (from sheep's milk only), penteleu (from mix of sheep's and cow's milk), dalia and rucăr (both from cow's milk only). But the term is often used by extension as a generic name for all semi-hard yellow cheeses such as the Swiss Emmental cheese, the Dutch Gouda and the British Cheddar, or anything that looks similar to cașcaval.

During the communist regime, because of the food shortages, Romanian housewives developed a technique for a homemade pressed cheese, similar to cașcaval, made out of milk, smântână, butter and eggs. In Romanian cuisine, a lot of dishes are made with cașcaval, like cașcaval pane or mămăligă.

North Macedonia 

Kashkaval cheese is very popular in North Macedonia. It is mostly made of cow's milk, however both a sheep's milk and a mixed (cow's and sheep's milk) variant is widely available. Kashkaval is also a synonym for any yellow cheese, to the extent that the word "cheese" mostly means white cheese such as feta, while yellow cheeses such as Gouda or Emmental have the suffix kashkaval attached to them in everyday speech, as simpy calling them cheese would be ludicrous, since they're not white cheeses.

Russia 
Kashkaval cheese is popular in Russia. In addition to the Balkan and Italian products, there exists also a Russian version of kashkaval.

Serbia 
In Serbia, kačkavalj is traditionally a sheep milk hard cheese, and as such a protected brand of the city of Pirot. Other cheeses, made from a mix of cow and sheep milk, are sometimes also branded as kačkavalj but they cannot be defined as pirotski (of Pirot).

Kačkavalj is one of the six traditional cheeses of Serbia. The production process (in Serbian) can be seen online, and according to a TV show video clip, it was brought to Pirot in the 1810s with the Dalmatian or Italian cheesemakers who settled in then-Ottoman Empire; the cheese was distributed throughout the Balkans (specifically mentioned in the link are Salonica and Istanbul).

Levant
In the Levant (Syria, Jordan, Palestinian territories, Israel, and Lebanon), qashqawān is widely used as a melting cheese, particularly in pastries. Hungarian-style kashkaval is the most common type found in the region.

Turkey

Kaşkaval (Ottoman: penir-i kaskaval) was a type of cheese consumed in Ottoman feasts. Evliya Çelebi's Seyahatnâme mentions that there at his time (17th century) in Istanbul 400 artisans produced different types of cheese: among them, cut cheese, Teleme cheese and Kaşkaval. In the same book is also mentioned that Kaşkaval cheese was produced in Çatalca.

Notes

References

See also

 List of cheeses
 List of stretch-cured cheeses

Further reading 
 Carić M. (1999) Ripened Cheese Varieties Native to the Balkan Countries. In: Fox P.F. (eds) Cheese: Chemistry, Physics and Microbiology. Springer, Boston, MA.

Cow's-milk cheeses
Sheep's-milk cheeses
Stretched-curd cheeses
Bulgarian cheeses
Jewish cuisine
Albanian cheeses
Greek cuisine
Albanian cuisine
Israeli cuisine
Macedonian cheeses
Romanian cheeses
Serbian cheeses
Serbian cuisine
Turkish cheeses